Frederic Mompou Dencausse (alternatively Federico Mompou; 16 April 189330 June 1987) was a Spanish and Catalan composer and pianist. He is remembered for his solo piano music and songs.

Life

Early years 
Mompou was born in Barcelona to the lawyer Frederic Mompou and his wife Josefina Dencausse, who was of French origin. His brother  (1888–1968) became a painter. His sketch of a simple farmhouse appeared on the covers of all of Frederic's published music.

Mompou studied piano under Pedro Serra at the Conservatori Superior de Música del Liceu before going to Paris, to study at the Conservatoire de Paris, which was headed by Gabriel Fauré. Mompou had heard Fauré perform in Barcelona when he was nine years old, and his music and performing style had made a powerful and lasting impression on him. He had a letter of introduction to Fauré from Enrique Granados, but it never reached its intended recipient. He entered the Conservatoire (with another Spaniard, José Iturbi), but studied with Isidor Philipp, head of the piano department. He also took private piano lessons with Ferdinand Motte-Lacroix and harmony and composition lessons with Marcel Samuel-Rousseau. His extreme shyness, introspection and self-effacement meant that he could not pursue a solo career, but chose to devote himself to composition instead. In 1917 he returned to Barcelona, fleeing the war. His first published work, Cants magics, appeared in 1920, mainly as a result of the advocacy of his friend Agustin Quintas.

1920s–1950s 
Mompou returned to Paris in 1921, by which time his music was being regularly performed publicly, by his former teacher Motte-Lacroix and others, and he found himself the darling of Paris. In 1921, his Scènes d'enfants (1915–18), performed by Motte-Lacroix, inspired the French critic Émile Vuillermoz to proclaim Mompou "the only disciple and successor" to Claude Debussy. Mompou himself often performed his own compositions, but only at private soirees, never in public. However, his time in Paris was not easy. He published no music between 1931 and 1941, when he left for his native Catalonia, fleeing the German occupation of Paris. In that time, his father died and his brother became seriously ill. The Spanish Civil War troubled him greatly. His personal financial situation was often dire enough to lead him away from music and into various business ventures, including an attempt to revive the traditional family bell foundry.

Kenneth MacMillan's ballet La Casa de los Pájaros (The House of Birds), set to orchestrations by John Lanchbery of various piano pieces by Mompou, was premiered at Sadler's Wells in London in 1955 and was also staged at the 4th Festival de Música y Danza at Granada.

In 1956 appeared Don Perlimpin (also seen as Don Perlimpinada), a ballet written in collaboration between Mompou and Xavier Montsalvatge and based on a play by Lorca. Most of the music was by Mompou, but Montsalvatge helped with the orchestration and linking passages and added two numbers of his own.

In 1957, aged 64, Mompou married the pianist Carmen Bravo (c.192329 April 2007). She was 30 years his junior. It was the first marriage for both of them and they had no children.

Later years 

An initial supporter of Franco's regime, in Barcelona he became a member of the Royal Academy of Sant Jordi, but otherwise lived quietly there until his death in 1987 at the age of 94 from respiratory failure. He is buried at the Montjuïc Cemetery in Barcelona.

In 1974 Mompou recorded his piano works for the Spanish record label Ensayo. These recordings have been issued on compact discs by both Ensayo and Brilliant Classics. In 1975 and 1976 he acted as a jury member for the first Paloma O'Shea Santander International Piano Competition.

After the death of his widow in 2007 about 80 unpublished and hitherto unknown works were discovered in Mompou’s files at his home and also in the files of the National Library of Catalonia. Some of them were given performances in Barcelona in 2008 by Jordi Masó and Mac McClure. Many others were given their premiere performances in 2009 by Marcel Worms.

During his career Mompou received numerous awards, including: Chevalier des arts et lettres (France), Premio Nacional de Música (Spain), Doctor honoris causa, Universitat de Barcelona (1979) and Medalla d'Or de la Generalitat de Catalunya (1980).

Style 
Mompou is best known as a miniaturist, writing short, relatively improvisatory music, often described as "delicate" or "intimate". His principal influences were French impressionism, Erik Satie and Gabriel Fauré, resulting in a style in which musical development is minimized and expression is concentrated into very small forms. He was fond of ostinato figures, bell imitations (his mother's family owned the Dencausse bell foundry and his grandfather was a bell maker), and a kind of incantatory, meditative sound, the most complete expression of which can be found in his masterpiece Musica Callada (or the Voice of Silence) based on the mystical poetry of Saint John of the Cross.
He was also influenced by the sounds and smells of the maritime quarter of Barcelona, the cry of seagulls, the sound of children playing and popular Catalan culture. He often dispensed with bar lines and key signatures. His music is rooted in the chord G–C–E–A–D, which he named Barri de platja (the Beach Quarter).

Selected works

Piano solo 
Impresiones íntimas (Intimate impressions), 9 miniatures, written 1911–1914
Pessebres (1914–1917) (Nativity Scenes)
Scènes d'enfants (1915–1918) (Scenes of children; later orchestrated by Alexandre Tansman)
Suburbis (1916–1917) (Suburbs; later orchestrated by Manuel Rosenthal)
Cants màgics (1920) (Magic Songs)
Fêtes lointaines (1920–1921) (Distant Celebrations)
Charmes (1920–1921)
Cançons i danses (1921–1979) (Songs and dances)
Dialogues (1923)
Préludes (1927–1960)
Variations on a Theme of Chopin (1938–1957) (based on Chopin's Prelude No. 7 in A major)
Paisatges (1942–1960) (Landscapes)
El Pont (1947)
Cançó de bressol (1951) (Lullaby)
Música callada (Silent music or Voices of silence) (Primer cuaderno – 1959, Segundo cuaderno – 1962, Tercer cuaderno – 1965, Cuarto cuaderno – 1967)

Voice and piano 
L'hora grisa (1916) (The grey hour)
Cuatro melodías (1925) (Four melodies)
Comptines (1926–1943) (Nursery Rhymes)
Combat del somni (1942–1948) (Dream combat)
Cantar del alma (1951) (Soul Song)
Canciones becquerianas (1971) (Songs after Bécquer)

Ballets 
Don Perlimpin (1956; written with Xavier Montsalvatge)

Choral 
Los Improperios (The Insults), for chorus and orchestra (1964; written in memory of Francis Poulenc)
L'Ocell daurat (The Golden Bird), cantata for children's choir (1970)

Guitar 
Suite Compostelana for guitar (1962; composed for Andrés Segovia)
"Cançó i dansa No. 10" (Sobre dos Cantigas del Rei Alfonso X), originally for piano (1953), transcribed for guitar by the composer (undated manuscript)
"Cançó i dansa No. 13" (Cançó: El cant dels ocells; Dansa (El bon caçador)) for guitar (1972)

Recordings 
Mompou himself recorded a few of his piano pieces for EMI in 1950 and then a much larger portion of his piano output, including the Musica callada, for Ensayo in 1974, when he was over 80 years old. The later recordings have been released in a boxed set of 4 CDs by Brilliant Classics. For decades, other pianists rarely recorded his works, with major figures such as Arthur Rubinstein, Guiomar Novaes, Magda Tagliaferro, and Arturo Benedetti Michelangeli recording just a handful of his pieces. In the late 1950s, Mompou's wife, Carmen Bravo, recorded some of his works for EMI.

The Spanish specialist Alicia de Larrocha recorded a larger selection, and more recently, Mompou's works have received greater attention. Acclaimed contemporary pianists such as Stephen Hough in 1997 and Arcadi Volodos in 2013 have released full CDs devoted to his pieces, and Jordi Masó has recorded a cycle of Mompou's piano works for Naxos Records. Other contemporary pianists who have recorded Mompou's pieces include Daniil Trifonov, Alexandre Tharaud, Herbert Henck, Clelia Iruzun, Jenny Lin, Aaron Krister Johnson, and Javier Perianes, among others. British pianist Martin Jones has recorded the complete piano works of Mompou for Nimbus, including those unpublished in Mompou's lifetime, many of which were discovered when his apartment was cleared out in 2008. The great Spanish soprano Victoria de los Ángeles recorded Mompou's haunting song cycle El combat del somni, and a video from 1971 survives of her singing one of these songs in her living room with the composer as her accompanist.

Also, Spanish guitar great Andrés Segovia recorded Mompou's Suite Compostelana, which was dedicated to him.

References

Further reading

External links 
Biography, catalogue, discography, gallery – in Spanish, French and English
Piano Society: Frederic Mompou
Personal papers of Frederic Mompou in the Biblioteca de Catalunya

1893 births
1987 deaths
Composers from Catalonia
Catalan pianists
Musicians from Barcelona
Burials at Montjuïc Cemetery
Conservatori Superior de Música del Liceu alumni
Spanish classical composers
Spanish male classical composers
20th-century classical composers
Composers for piano
Pupils of Isidor Philipp
20th-century Spanish musicians
20th-century Spanish male musicians